Ozopactus is a monotypic genus of Venezuelan tarantulas containing the single species, Ozopactus ernsti. It was first described by Eugène Louis Simon in 1889, and is found in Venezuela. They have an enlarged sternum and an enlarged maxillae. The front of the ocularium is no longer than the back.

See also
 List of Theraphosidae species

References

Monotypic Theraphosidae genera
Spiders of South America
Theraphosidae